Ashley McConnell is an American author. Her first novel, Unearthed, was a finalist for the Bram Stoker Award from the Horror Writers of America. In addition to horror, she has published numerous fantasy and media tie-in novels, including several for the television shows Quantum Leap, Buffy the Vampire Slayer and Stargate SG-1, and several short stories.

Works
Unearthed (1991)
Days of the Dead (1992)

Demon Wars series 
 Demon Wars #1 "The Fountains of Mirlacca" (1995)
 Demon Wars #2 "The Itinerant Exorcist" (1996)
 Demon Wars #3 "The Courts of Sorcery" (1996)

Quantum Leap series 
 Quantum Leap #1 Quantum Leap: The Novel (1992) aka "Carny Knowledge"
 Quantum Leap #2 Too Close for Comfort (1993)
 Quantum Leap #3 The Wall (1993)
 Quantum Leap #4 Prelude (1994)
 Quantum Leap #7 Random Measures (1994)

Highlander series 
 Highlander #2 "Scimitar" (1996)

Stargate SG-1 series 
 Stargate SG-1 #2 "The Price You Pay" (1999)
 Stargate SG-1 #3 "The First Amendment" (2000)
 Stargate SG-1 #4 "The Morpheus Factor" (2001)

Buffyverse 
 Buffy - These Our Actors (2002) (with Dori Koogler)
 Angel - Book of the Dead (2004)

External links
Bookography
Personal web

Living people
20th-century American novelists
21st-century American novelists
20th-century American women writers
21st-century American women writers
American horror novelists
American women novelists
Women horror writers
Year of birth missing (living people)